Moran may refer to:

Places

Antarctica
 Moran Bluff, Marie Byrd Land
 Moran Buttress, Marie Byrd Land
 Moran Glacier, Alexander Island

Asia
 Moran Town, Assam, India
 Moran, Israel, a kibbutz
 Moran Hill, North Korea
 Moran Station, a station of the Seoul Metropolitan Subway in Seongnam, South Korea

North America
 Moran, British Columbia, Canada, a railway point
 Moran Canyon (British Columbia), a natural feature on the Fraser River
 Moran, Indiana, an unincorporated town
 Moran, Kansas, a city
 Moran, Ohio, a neighborhood of Streetsboro, Ohio
 Moran, Texas, a city
 Moran, Virginia, an unincorporated community
 Moran, Wyoming, an unincorporated community
 Moran Canyon (Wyoming)
 Moran Creek (Minnesota)
 Moran Creek (Hay Creek tributary), Montana
 Moran Formation, Texas, a geologic formation
 Moran Lake, British Columbia, Canada
 Moran River, Michigan
 Moran State Park, Washington
 Moran Township, Michigan
 Moran Township, Richland County, North Dakota, Richland County, North Dakota
 Moran Township, Todd County, Minnesota
 Mount Moran, Wyoming

South America
 Morán Municipality, Venezuela

Elsewhere
 10372 Moran, an asteroid

Persons with the name
 Moran (given name), a unisex given name
 Moran (surname), an Irish surname
 Moran (Syriac), Syriac title for Jesus Christ
 Morán, a Spanish surname

Groups of people
 Moran (Maasai) or Il-murran, warriors among the Maasai of Kenya
 Moran people, an ethnic group of Assam

Fictional characters
 Moran, the title character of the 1922 American film Moran of the Lady Letty
 Moran, a female Irish Quidditch player in Harry Potter and the Goblet of Fire
 Gia Moran, a female character in Power Rangers Megaforce
 Michael Moran, the title character of the 1928 American film Moran of the Marines
 Sebastian Moran, an enemy of Sherlock Holmes

Other uses
 MORAN, an acronym for Multi-Operator Radio Access Network
 Baron Moran, British peerage title
 Kenyan Morans, nickname of Kenya's national basketball team
 Moran Building, Washington, DC, on the National Register of Historic Places
 Moran Dam, a proposed dam on the Fraser River at Moran, British Columbia, Canada
 Moran language, an extinct Tibeto-Burman language of India
 Moran Medal in Statistical Sciences, awarded every two years by the Australian Academy of Science
 Moran Municipal Generation Station, Burlington, Vermont, a power plant
 Moran Shipping Agencies, a U.S.-based steamship agency company
 Moran's Oyster Cottage, a seafood restaurant and pub in Kilcolgan, County Galway, Ireland

See also
 
 
 Morans Falls, Queensland, Australia

 Moren, a surname
 Morin (disambiguation)
 Moron (disambiguation)
 Muran (disambiguation)
 Morano (disambiguation)